Pratapnagar or Protapnagar may refer to:

 Pratapnagar Assembly constituency, Uttarakhand, India
 also subdivision, tehsil, block in Tehri Garhwal district, Uttarakhand, India
 Pratapnagar railway station,  Vadodara, Gujarat, India
 Pratapnagar, a village in Protapnagar Union, Satkhira district, Bangladesh